The Men's United States Squash Open 2011 is the men's edition of the 2011 United States Open (squash), which is a PSA World Series event Gold (Prize money: $115,000). The event took place at the Daskalakis Athletic Center in Philadelphia, Pennsylvania in the United States from the 30th of September to the 6th October. Amr Shabana won his second US Open trophy, beating Nick Matthew in the final.

Prize money and ranking points
For 2011, the prize purse was $115,000. The prize money and points breakdown is as follows:

Seeds

Draw and results

See also
United States Open (squash)
2011 Men's World Open Squash Championship
Women's United States Open (squash) 2011
PSA World Series 2011

References

External links
PSA US Open 2011 website
US Squash Open official website
US Squash Open 2011 Squashinfo website

Squash tournaments in the United States
Men's US Open
Men's US Open
2011 in sports in Pennsylvania
Squash in Pennsylvania